The Occupied Clinic: Militarism and Care in Kashmir is a monograph by Saiba Varma, in the field of medical anthropology. It was published in October 2020 by Duke University Press (as well as Yoda Press) and went on to receive the Edie Turner First Book Prize in Ethnographic Writing by the American Anthropological Association.

Content 
Varma's scholarship discusses the broad effects of, what she calls, India's occupation of Kashmir on the mental health of local population. She probes into how local psychiatric clinics tackle these issues but in the process, become microcosms of the broader political fractures governing Kashmir.

Author 
Varma is an Associate Professor of Medical Anthropology at University of California, San Diego. She is also the incumbent Vice Chair of Undergraduate Studies.

Controversy 
Varma has been accused of not being transparent about her positionality — she did not disclose that her father was a top brass of India's security apparatus.

References

External links

2021 non-fiction books
Books about the Kashmir conflict
Duke University Press books
Medical anthropology